Antanimenabaka is a town and commune in Madagascar. It belongs to the district of Andilamena, which is a part of Alaotra-Mangoro Region. The population of the commune was estimated to be approximately 15,000 in 2001 commune census.

Primary and junior level secondary education are available in town. The majority 75% of the population of the commune are farmers, while an additional 20% receives their livelihood from raising livestock. The most important crop is rice, while other important products are peanuts, beans, maize and cassava.  Services provide employment for 5% of the population.

Transport
Route nationale 32

References and notes 

Populated places in Alaotra-Mangoro